Ramona Beach is a populated place in Oswego County, New York, United States.  Ramona Beach is in the Town of Richland, located on the shore of Lake Ontario.

References

Hamlets in Oswego County, New York
Populated places on Lake Ontario in the United States